Nochnitsa (rus.: ночница, literally – nightling) is a genus of gorgonopsian therapsid from the Kotelnich red beds of Permian Russia. It contains one species, Nochnitsa geminidens. It the most basal known gorgonopsian and among the smallest members of the clade known to date.

Discovery and naming

The only known specimen of Nochnitsa, cataloged KPM 310, was discovered in 1994 by the Russian paleontologist Albert J. Khlyupin in the Red Beds of Kotelnich, located along the Vyatka River in Kirov Oblast, European Russia. This specimen was found more precisely in the Vanyushonki Member, a site already known for the discovery of other contemporary therapsids, including the gorgonopsian Viatkogorgon. The datation of this site is not clear, but it seems to date to the latest Guadalupian or early Lopingian epochs.

In 2018, paleontologists Christian F. Kammerer and Vladimir Masyutin named new genera of gorgonopsians and therocephalians discovered at Kotelnitch in two articles in the scientific journal PeerJ. In their paper focusing on gorgonopsians, the specimen KPM 310 is identified as the holotype of a new genus and species, which they name Nochnitsa geminidens.

Nochnitsa is named after the Nocnitsa, a nocturnal hag-like creature from Slavic mythology. Its name was intended as a parallel to the Gorgons, similarly hag-like creatures from Greek mythology, which are the namesake of many genera within Gorgonopsia and the clade as a whole. The name also reflects the nocturnal habits inferred for the genus. The type species name, geminidens, means "twin tooth" and refers to one of the autapomorphies of the species, postcanine teeth arranged in pairs.

Description

Skull 
 	
 
It had a relatively long snout with five incisors, a canine, and six postcanine teeth on each side. The postcanine teeth are autapomorphic for the genus in being arranged in three pairs of closely placed teeth separated by longer diastemata. In each pair, the posterior tooth is larger. The mandible is relatively slender and lacks a strong "chin", unlike other gorgonopsians.

Postcranial skeleton 

Although incompletely known, the holotype specimen of Nochnitsa contains part of the postcranial elements with the skull, including the cervical vertebrae, some dorsal vertebrae, and associated ribs. The right forelimb is also preserved and partially articulated.

In the cervical vertebrae, the axial spine is broadly rounded and similar in morphology to that of other gorgonopsians. The dorsal vertebrae are preserved as central and transverse process fragments interspersed by the ribs. The ribs are also simple and elongated. The scapula is elongated, narrow and weakly curved, comparable to that of other gorgonopsians of similar size like Cyonosaurus, but different from the anteroposteriorly broadened scapular spines of Inostrancevia.

The humerus is relatively slender, having a short, poorly developed delto-pectoral ridge, where the muscles attach to the upper arm. The radius and ulna, have a distinct distal curvature, and the distal tip of the radius forms a discrete differentiated rim of the shaft. No olecranon process is visible on the ulna, but it is possible that this is the result of a lesion. The preserved proximal carpal elements consist of the radial, the ulnar and two smaller, irregular elements that would probably represent the centralia. The ulnar is the longest carpus on the proximodistal side and is widened at its proximal and distal ends. The radial is a shorter and more rounded element. The possible centralia, although poorly preserved, appear to be weakly curved. The concave surface of the centralia would presumably have been articulated with the radial, based on the conditions of other gorgonopsians. Several small irregular bones between the proximal carpals and the metacarpals probably represent distal carpals, but these elements are too poorly preserved to be further identified. Based on their great length relative to the other manual elements, the two best preserved elements probably represent the third and fourth metacarpals, which are the longest of all other gorgonopsians for which the manus are known. A shorter but still elongated element may represent the fifth metacarpal. A semi-articulated set of poorly preserved bones appear to represent fingers, one potentially ending in the ungual. Based on the size of the phalanx-like elements, these probably correspond to the third and fourth fingers, disarticulated from the third and fourth metacarpals. These elements are too poor for a definitive count of the phalanges, and there is no clear evidence of the reduced disc-shaped phalanges commonly present in gorgonopsians.

Classification

Nochnitsa is currently the most basal gorgonopsian known, and its position is justified by several plesiomorphic criteria, such as the lowered mandibular symphysis, the low and inclined front of the dentary bone (similar to those of therocephalians), as well as a surface and a row of elongated teeth. These mentioned features are not present in derived genera. The 2018 analysis by Kammerer and Masyutin, although derived from a previous analysis conducted by one of the two authors, is a major revision of the phylogeny of the gorgonopsians, discovering that the derived representatives are divided into two groups, of Russian and African origin. The basal position of Nochnitsa in phylogenetic analysis of gorgonopsians is still recognized in later published studies.

The following cladogram showing the position of Nochnitsa within Gorgonopsia follows Kammerer and Rubidge (2022):

Paleobiology
 	
 
Nochnitsa was a small predator, unlike later gorgonopsians which were large-bodied apex predators. It was a relatively rare member of its ecosystem. The apex predators of the Kotelnich faunal assemblage were large-bodied therocephalians such as Gorynychus and Viatkosuchus.

See also 

 Viatkogorgon, another gorgonopsian from the Vanyushonki Member.

Notes

References

External links 
 

Gorgonopsia
Prehistoric therapsid genera
Guadalupian synapsids of Europe
Lopingian synapsids of Europe
Permian Russia
Fossils of Russia
Fossil taxa described in 2018